Delicate Membrane is the debut studio album of SubArachnoid Space, released on September 9, 1996, by Charnel Music.

Track listing

Personnel 
Adapted from the Delicate Membrane liner notes.

SubArachnoid Space
 Melynda Jackson – guitar
 Mason Jones – guitar, bass guitar
 Michelle Schreiber – percussion

Production and additional personnel
 Myles Boisen – mastering
 SubArachnoid Space – cover art

Release history

References

External links 
 Delicate Membrane at Discogs (list of releases)

1996 debut albums
SubArachnoid Space albums
Charnel Music albums